Saint Karas the Anchorite, also known as Anbba Karas (الأنبا كاراس), was a saint of the Coptic Orthodox Church who lived during the late fifth and early sixth centuries. Anbba Karas used to be a monk. According to his biographer, the Coptic monk Saint Pambo, he spent 57 years in isolation in the Scetis Desert in communion with God who visited him every day in his cave. After his death,God closed the cave on his body as the world doesn't deserve his footstep. The location of his cave is unknown.

The vita of Saint Karas, told was written by the Egyptian monk, Saint Bemwah (AKA St.Bemwah, Anbba Bemwah); it was translated from the Syrian Monastery (Der el-Surian) manuscripts by Nashed and Archdeacon Aziz Nashed.

In the vita St. Bemwah wrote, l let you know my brethren what happened one day. I heard a voice calling me three times. When I paid attention I realized the voice was a heavenly call, as I looked up and said, Speak, O Lord, for your servant is listening."

The voice commanded me "get up Bemwah and hurry to the wilderness where you will meet Anbba Karas, so that you may take his blessing, as he is so precious to Me more than anyone else as He worked very hard to serve Me, and I will be with you".

I left my church and walked alone into the wilderness with great happiness. I didn't know where to go, but I knew for sure that God, who ordered me, would get me there. After several days of walking, and after I met three other anchorites, I finally reached my destination, I arrived at a cave. When I announced my arrival. a voice came from inside saying, "It is good that you came today Anbba Bemwah, God's saint, the one who was worthy to shroud the holy body of St. Hillaria the daughter of the great King Zenon".

I entered the cave and was staring at this person for a long while, as he was venerable and full of awe. His face was a very lighted; he had a long beard with only a few black strands and was wearing a poor dress. He was thin, with soft voice and had a walking staff.

He said, "You came to me today and brought death with you, and I have been waiting for you for a long time my beloved one". When I asked him about his name and how long he had been in this wilderness?, he said, "my name is Karas, I haven't seen no one for 57 years, and I have been waiting for you anxiously and happily".

At the end of my first day Anbba Karas, became sick with a high fever and On the following day while he was lying down unable to move. A great light, brighter than the sunlight, was shining upon the cave entrance. A lighted figure wearing white cloth as bright as the sun entered holding a shiny cross on his right hand. I was sitting by 'Anbba Karas' feet and was very scared. This person stepped forward toward Anbba Karas and touched his face with the cross. He spoke with Anbba Karas for a while, then blessed him and left. When I inquired about this glorified person?, he said, this is our Lord and master Jesus Christ, He comes to me everyday, talks to me, blesses me, and then He leaves. I then asked him if I can get blessed from my lord Jesus Christ as well..?. He said, "Before you leave this place, you will see the Lord Jesus in His glory and He will bless you and talk to you as well".

On the 8th day of Epip, Anbba Karas health was deteriorating. By mid-day, a great light appeared and filled the cave, The Savior of the universe entered, preceded by the Archangels Michael and Gabriel, and many other angels with six wings seraphim accompanied by prayers, hymns and great smell of incense from everywhere. I was sitting by Anbba Karas feet while our Lord Jesus Christ in all His glory was at Anbba Karas's head, who held our Savior's right hand. Anbba Karas, asked Jesus Christ if He can bless me because he came from very far, for this day?. The Lord looked at me and said, "May My peace be with you Bemwah, what you saw and heard today, will be written in the books and preached by you. But for you, My beloved Karas, every human that knows your vita and mentions your name on earth, will have My peace on them and I will count them with the martyrs and the saints. Everyone that offer wine, bread, incense, oil or candles in your name, I will reward them twofold in the Kingdom of Heaven. Anyone who feeds the hungry or gives drink to the thirsty, or clothes to the needy or welcomes a stranger on your name, I will reward them double in My kingdom. And who writes your vita I will write their name in the Book of Life. Anyone who shows mercy on your anniversary, I will give them what no eye had ever seen and, what no ear had ever heard and what any heart ever felt. Now, my beloved Karas, I want you to ask Me for something that I can do for you before your departure.

Upon his request, David the Prophet came holding his harp in his hand and he was singing the psalm "This is the day the Lord has made; let us rejoice and be glad in it." Psalm 117:24. Anbba Karas then asked if he can do the ten cords together with the tune and melody. David moved his harp and start singing, "Precious in the sight of the Lord is the death of His saints. Psalm 16:15". Anbba Karas soul departed from his blessed body to the bosom of our Good Savior, who took it and presented it to the Michael (archangel).

I, then, kissed the body of my father Anbba Karas and prepared him for burial. The Glorious Lord pointed to me to leave the cave. The Lord Jesus Christ, surrounded by His angels, left in front of my father's soul accompanied by songs and hymns. Our Glorious Lord then sealed the entrance shut, I watched as the cave entrance disappear and became part of the mountain, and they all  in

References

Further reading
"Abba Karas the Anchorite" Coptichymns.net.
"Anba Karas The Anchorite" Abba Antony, vol. 7, June 1997
Pope Shenouda III. "Our Fathers the Anchorites"

Christian saints in unknown century
Coptic Orthodox saints
Year of birth unknown